"El Truco" is the fourth and last single by Daddy Yankee from his album Barrio Fino en Directo.

Charts

References

2006 singles
Spanish-language songs
Daddy Yankee songs
Songs written by Daddy Yankee
2005 songs